Shabad is a town and a mandal in Ranga Reddy district in the state of Telangana in India. Its name is sometimes written as Shahabad. It is situated about 45 km from Hyderabad, the state capital. This town is well connected with roads, a state highway runs through Shabad, which connects Shabad with Hyderabad, and nearby Chevella, Shamshabad and Shadnagar towns.

Geography
It has a similar climate as that of Hyderabad, but now the place is cooler compared to Hyderabad. As the town is surrounded by water bodies and forests, it has a cooler climate. In summer the temperature rises to about 31 degrees C, and in winter it falls to about 15 degrees C, and even some times less than 8 degrees C.

Panchayats
The following is the list of village panchayats in Shabad mandal.

 Bobbilgam 
 Tirumalapur
 Elgondaguda
 Etlaerravaly
 Tadlapalle
 Rudraram
 Chandenvalle
 Hayathabad
 Solipet
 Maddur
 Peddaved
 Dammerlapalle
 Nagarkunta
 Bhongirpalle
 Machanpalle
 Polaram
 Pothugal
 Regadidoswada
 Komerabanda
 Obagunta
 Shabad
 Manmarri
 Kakloor
 Ananthawaram
 Kesaguda
 Rangapur
 Kummariguda
 Muddem guda

Prominent Schools
Dhyanahita High School
Government High School
Government Primary Schools
Government ZPHS High School Girls
Government Urdu Medium School
Holy Spirit High School
Navajeevan High School
Sri Saraswathi Shishu Mandir
Sumedha Montessori E/m High School
Telangana State Model High School

Colleges
PRRM College of Engineering and Technology
PRRM Pharmacy College
PRRM College of Pharmacy
TSMS Junior College

Places of interest
The town contains many temples, mosques, and churches. There are about four mosques in Shabad along with a landmark mosque called ID GAH Shabad, which is believed to have been built by Mughal emperor Aurangzeb. There is the dargah of Hazrath Pahelwaan Shah Wali situated adjacent to the Shahabad tank. A famous Lord Sri Krishna temple is in Nagarkunta village. This village is 5 km from Shabad. Near Muddem Guda there is a Lord Shiva temple and some associated monuments. In shabad near yelgondaguda there is Meerapur dargah it is a famous dargah everyday a lot of people come to dargah. There are four churches Aroygyapuri Roman Catholic Church and Mennonite Brothers Church both are located in S.C colony(Harijanwada)the other two churches are in Shabad behind the cooperative bank. The Katta Maisamma temple on the way to Keshavguda, Golluriguda is a famous temple. The lake road is used for relaxing and has a good sunset sight.

Languages
The major languages spoken in Shabad are Telugu and Urdu. English and Hindi are occasionally used.

Crops
The place is much suitable for harvesting tomatoes (2-3 truckloads of tomatoes are transported to Hyderabad every day). In addition, farmers grow other crops including many flowers and vegetables, as well as rice, jower, cotton, and corn.

References

External links 
TS village list

Mandals in Ranga Reddy district